Daniele Varè (12 January 1880 – 27 February 1956) was an Italian expatriate diplomat and author, most famous for the China-set novel The Maker of Heavenly Trousers (republished in 2012 by Penguin Modern Classics). He is also remembered for the Laughing Diplomat (John Murray, 1938), his autobiography as Italian diplomat.

Varè's father, Giovanni Battista Varè (Venice 1817 – Rome 1884), a lawyer, of the L'Indipendente newspaper and associate of Daniel Manin: hence as an Italian nationalist he was exiled from northern Italy by the then Austrian authorities.

Later he was vice-president of the Venetian Assembly and della camera Italiana : ministero Guardasigilli del Regno (Ministri di grazia e giustizia del Regno d'Italia) in 1879.

Varè spent his early years in the UK, returning to Italy with his Scottish mother at the age of 11. His mother had met Giambattista in Rome in 1872 and married him in 1873. Young Daniele entered the Italian Diplomatic Service in 1907 and was first assigned to China in 1912. In 1909 he had married Elizabeth Bettina Chalmers of Aldbar Castle near Brechin. He returned as Italian Minister (Ambassador) to the Republican Government in China between 1927 and 1931. In Beijing he had as a subordinate Galeazzo Ciano (later to become Benito Mussolini's Minister of Foreign Affairs). He also served in Geneva, Copenhagen and Luxembourg.

In 1932, while serving as Ambassador to Denmark, he was forced to resign by the Fascist Regime as many other Italian Diplomats. Hence he originally published in English and only later in Italian.

Works
His novels include: The Maker of Heavenly Trousers (Der Schneider himmlischer Hosen) (1926), was followed by The Gate of Happy Sparrows (1937) and The Temple of Costly Experience (Der Tempel der kostbaren Weisheit) (1939), set in the early twentieth century in the Chinese capital of Peking, where the author spent two lengthy periods serving as a diplomat in the Italian Legation as a First Secretary (1912–1920) and later, Minister (1927–1931).

Other works were: Princess in Tartary: a Play for Marionettes in Two Acts and an Epilogue (1940); Gaia Melodia. Romanzo (1944); The Last of the Empresses and the Passing from the Old China to the New (1947); Twilight of the Kings (1948) - memoir/reminiscences; The Two Imposters (1949) - essays/journals/memoir; The Doge's Ring (1949); Ghosts of the Spanish Steps (1955) - essays/pen portraits; Ghosts of the Rialto - essays/pen portraits (1956); Palma (1957).

References

The Spectator's review of his biography, (Laughing Diplomat), 30 September 1938.

External links
 

1880 births
1956 deaths
20th-century Italian male writers
Ambassadors of Italy to China
Italian diplomats
Place of birth missing
20th-century diplomats
20th-century Italian novelists